The official results of the Women's 20 km Walk at the 1999 World Championships in Sevilla, Spain, held on Friday 27 August 1999, starting at 18:50h local time.

Medalists

Abbreviations
All times shown are in hours:minutes:seconds

Records

Startlist

Intermediates

Final ranking

See also
 1996 Women's Olympic 10km Walk (Atlanta)
 1998 Women's European Championships 10km Walk (Budapest)
 1999 Race Walking Year Ranking
 2000 Women's Olympic 20km Walk (Sydney)
 2002 Women's European Championships 20km Walk (Munich)

References
 Results
 trackandfieldnews
 Die Leichtathletik-Statistik-Seite

R
Racewalking at the World Athletics Championships
1999 in women's athletics